Chankuni (Aymara) is a mountain in the Cordillera Real in the Andes of Bolivia, about  high. It is situated in the La Paz Department, Murillo Province, La Paz Municipality. Chankuni lies between the mountains Sankayuni in the west and Ullumani in the east, north-east of the mountain Kunturiri.

References 

Mountains of La Paz Department (Bolivia)